Admiral  was a Japanese naval commander, commander of the Combined Fleet of the Imperial Japanese Navy (1931–1933) and the 17th Governor-General of Taiwan (1936–1940).

Early life and career
Kobayashi was born in 1877 in Hiroshima and pursued a naval career. After graduating from the Imperial Naval Academy with honors, in 1898 Kobayashi first served as an ensign on the corvette Hiei and by 1900 was promoted as a second lieutenant on the battleship Hatsuse. In 1917 he was promoted to commander and took command of the cruiser Hirado. In 1920, Kobayashi was appointed naval attaché to the Imperial Japanese Embassy in London, and was appointed to the rank of rear admiral in 1922. In 1928, by now a vice admiral, Kobayashi commanded a naval squadron on board Izumo that visited Sydney Harbour, being the fourth time he had visited Sydney, and was received by the Governor of NSW, Sir Dudley de Chair, with whom he had served on HMS Collingwood.

During the First World War, Kobayashi was awarded the US Navy Cross, for his actions in support of the Allied fleet, and with the end of the war he served on the committee tasked with the disposal of enemy naval vessels and was Japan's chief naval expert at the 1927 Geneva Naval Conference tasked with arms limitations. In June 1930, he was appointed Deputy Minister of Navy and in December 1931 was appointed as the Commander of the Combined Fleet of the Imperial Japanese Navy. His promotion to Admiral was confirmed on 1 March 1933. In March 1936, in the aftermath of the February 26 Incident, Kobayashi was transferred to the Naval reserve and was appointed as Governor-General of Taiwan on 2 September 1936.

Governor-General of Taiwan
As the first military governor after a long period of the rule of civilian governors, Koobayashi followed a policy of "Japanization", believing that the colonial status should be abolished in favour of removing the distinction between the Taiwanese and the Japanese on the island and making the territory a fundamental part of the Japan homeland. As Governor-General, in April 1937 Kobayashi ordered the banning of all the Chinese-language media in the colony, with the supremacy of the Japanese language being confirmed, a policy that was soon followed in the colony's schools. This policy was termed , which roughly meant a "campaign to transform [the conquered people] into the subjects of the emperor". This new aggressive colonial policy also necessitated the imposition of State Shinto and bans on traditional Chinese festivals and customs. With the start of the Pacific War in 1941, Kobayashi oversaw the beginnings of the Greater East Asia Co-Prosperity Sphere in the colony and the end of its colonial status as an integral part of the Japanese home islands.

Later life and career
After resigning from the post of governor in August 1944, he became a senator, and in December received a ministerial portfolio as Minister of State, which he resigned in March 1945. In February 1946 he stepped down from his position as a senator.

References

1877 births
1962 deaths
Military personnel from Hiroshima Prefecture
Japanese military personnel of the Russo-Japanese War
Japanese military personnel of World War I
Imperial Japanese Navy admirals
Governors-General of Taiwan
Grand Cordons of the Order of the Rising Sun
Recipients of the Order of the Sacred Treasure, 1st class
Recipients of the Navy Cross (United States)
Japanese naval attachés